John Oldershaw (died 1847) was a British clergyman.

He entered Emmanuel College, Cambridge University in 1771 and was senior wrangler and 1st Smith's prizeman in 1776.  He received an M.A. in 1779, a B.D. in 1786.

He was Archdeacon of Norfolk from 1797 to 1847.

References

External links
 
 

1847 deaths
Archdeacons of Norfolk
Alumni of Emmanuel College, Cambridge
Senior Wranglers
Year of birth unknown